The 2016 Alabama Crimson Tide football team represented the University of Alabama in the 2016 NCAA Division I FBS football season. This season marked the Crimson Tide's 122nd overall season, 83rd as a member of the Southeastern Conference (SEC) and its 25th within the SEC Western Division. They played their home games at Bryant–Denny Stadium in Tuscaloosa, Alabama and were led by tenth year head coach Nick Saban. They finished the season 14–1, were SEC champions and advanced to the College Football Playoff National Championship game, for the second consecutive year, where they were defeated by Clemson.

Previous season and offseason

In 2015, Alabama came into the season ranked No. 2 in both preseason polls and finished the regular season 12–1, 7–1 SEC, with their only loss to Ole Miss again. The Crimson Tide won the Western Division of the SEC following Ole Miss' 2nd conference loss to Arkansas and qualified to play in the 2015 SEC Championship Game against the Florida Gators. Alabama defeated the Gators, 29–15 in Atlanta, Georgia, clinching the program's 25th SEC title. As the #2 seed in the second season of the College Football Playoff, the Crimson Tide were selected to play in the semifinal game at the 2015 Cotton Bowl against #3 Michigan State of the Big Ten. Alabama beat the Spartans in a 38–0 shutout, advancing them to the 2016 College Football Playoff National Championship Game against #1 Clemson of the ACC. The Crimson Tide won the game 45–40, capturing their 16th national championship and making Nick Saban the 2nd coach in college football to win five championship titles. The Crimson Tide finished the 2015 season with a record of 14–1.

Departures
Notable departures from the 2015 squad included

Preseason

2016 recruiting class

Prior to National Signing Day on February 3, 2016, eight players enrolled for the spring semester in order to participate in spring practice and included six former high school seniors and two junior college transfers.
On National Signing Day, Alabama signed 18 additional players out of high school that completed the 2016 recruiting class. The class was highlighted by 19 players from the "ESPN 300". Alabama signed the No. 1 recruiting class according to Rivals.com, Scout.com and 247Sports.com and No. 2 at ESPN recruiting class.

Returning starters
Alabama had seven returning players on offense, five on defense and five on special teams that started games in 2015.

Offense

Defense

Special teams

Spring practice
Spring practice began March 11, 2016.  The annual A-Day game was held on April 16, 2016.

Coaching staff

Graduate Assistants
Brian Niedermeyer
Doug Belk
Analysts 
William Vlachos
Mike Locksley
Shea Tierney
Steve Sarkisian
Charlie Weis Jr.
Garrett Cox
 Freddie Roach

Roster

Depth chart

Schedule
Alabama faced all six Western Division opponents: Arkansas, Auburn, LSU, Mississippi State, Ole Miss, and Texas A&M. They also faced two Eastern Division opponents: official SEC rival Tennessee, and Kentucky.

The team played four non-conference games, three home games against the Western Kentucky of C-USA, Kent State of the MAC, Chattanooga of the FCS' Southern, and traveled to Arlington, TX to play USC of the Pac-12 for the Advocare Classic at AT&T Stadium, a non—conference game at a neutral site.

Game summaries

#20 USC Trojans

This game was the eighth meeting between the Trojans and Crimson Tide, and the first meeting between the two schools since the 1985 Aloha Bowl, which Alabama won 24–3.  Alabama is now 6–2 in the series.

Western Kentucky Hilltoppers

#19 Ole Miss Rebels

The Crimson Tide began conference play against Ole Miss, who entered the game on a two-game winning streak against Alabama, their longest winning streak in the series.

Kent State Golden Flashes

This was only be the second meeting between these two schools, the first coming in 2012.  Alabama coach Nick Saban is a graduate of Kent State.

Kentucky Wildcats

#16 Arkansas Razorbacks

#9 Tennessee Volunteers

Alabama will attempt to extend their nine-game winning streak over the Volunteers, the second longest winning streak in series history.

#6 Texas A&M Aggies

#15 LSU Tigers

Mississippi State Bulldogs

Chattanooga Mocs

81st Iron Bowl

#16 Auburn Tigers

SEC Championship

#15 Florida Gators

College Football Playoff

#4 Washington

#2 Clemson Tigers

Rankings

Statistics

Team

Offense

Defense
|-
Key: POS: Position, SOLO: Solo Tackles, AST: Assisted Tackles, TOT: Total Tackles, TFL: Tackles-for-loss, SACK: Quarterback Sacks, INT: Interceptions, BU: Passes Broken Up, PD: Passes Defended, QBH: Quarterback Hits, FF: Forced Fumbles, FR: Fumbles Recovered, BLK: Kicks or Punts Blocked, SAF: Safeties

Special teams

Scores by quarter (all opponents)

Scores by quarter (SEC opponents)

Postseason and awards

Conference awards

Preseason award watchlists

Overall awards

Offensive awards

Defensive awards

Semifinalists
 Players 

 Coaches

Finalists
 Players 

 Coaches

Honors
 Week 1

 Week 2

 Week 3

 Week 4

 Week 5

 Week 6

 Week 7

 Week 8

 Week 9

 Week 10

 Week 11

 Week 12

 Week 13

 Week 14
 Bye

Preseason All-SEC Team
First-Team Offense
O.J. Howard - TE

Cam Robinson - OL

Calvin Ridley - WR

Second-Team Offense
Alphonse Taylor - OL

Third-Team Offense
Ross Pierschbacher - C

First-Team Defense
Jonathan Allen - DL

Reuben Foster - LB

Eddie Jackson - DB
Second-Team Defense

Third-Team Defense

First-Team Special Teams

Preseason All-Americans

All-Americans
Each year several publications release lists of their ideal "team". The athletes on these lists are referred to as All-Americans. The NCAA recognizes five All-American lists. They are the Associated Press (AP), American Football Coaches Association (AFCA), Football Writers Association of America (FWAA), Sporting News (SN), and the Walter Camp Football Foundation (WCFF). If a player is selected to the first team of three publications he is considered a consensus All-American, if a player is selected to the first team of all five publications he is considered a unanimous All-American.

Key:
First team
Consensus All-American
Unanimous All-American

SEC All-Conference Team
The Crimson Tide had TBA players honored as members of the 2016 SEC All-Conference team, with five each on the first and second teams, respectively. TBA other Crimson Tide earned honorable mention honors.

First Team
Second Team
Honorable Mention

All-Academic Teams

NCAA Academic All-Americans

SEC Conference All-Academic Players
The Crimson Tide had two players selected to the Southeastern Conference All-Academic Second Team, six players granted honorable mention and no players selected to the First Team. In order to be eligible for the academic team a player must maintain a minimum 3.0 overall grade-point average and play in at least 50 percent of their team's games.

First team
Second Team
Honorable Mention

Records broken

Postseason games

Senior Bowl

All Star Game

2017 NFL Draft

The 2017 NFL Draft was held on April 27–29 in Philadelphia. Ten Alabama players were selected as part of the draft, the second most in the draft behind Michigan's 11. Two additional Alabama players were signed to NFL teams as undrafted free agents.

References

Alabama
Alabama Crimson Tide football seasons
Southeastern Conference football champion seasons
Peach Bowl champion seasons
Alabama Crimson Tide football